Manohar Tahsildar (b 1946) is an Indian politician from the state of Karnataka.

Career
Tahsildar is a member of the Indian National Congress. He contested every Karnataka Vidhan Sabha election from 1978 to 2013 from Hangal constituency, winning the seat in 1978, 1989, 1999, and 2013. He lost from Hangal 5 times to C M Udasi, in 1983, 1985, 1994, 2004, 2008. He did not contest 2018 Vidhan Sabha Election.

He served as the Minister for Excise and Muzrai in the Siddaramaiah-led government between 29 October 2015 and 19 June 2016.

External links 
 Karnataka Legislative Assembly

References 

Living people
Indian National Congress politicians from Karnataka
1946 births
Karnataka MLAs 1978–1983
Karnataka MLAs 1989–1994
Karnataka MLAs 1999–2004
Karnataka MLAs 2013–2018